Ramón Luis Rivera Rivera (born June 21, 1929) is a Puerto Rican politician affiliated with the New Progressive Party. He served as Mayor of Bayamón from 1977 until 2001.

Early life
Rivera was born in Aguas Buenas. Rivera began his primary studies in his hometown of Aguas Buenas, but completed high school at the Dr. Agustín Stahl High School in Bayamón. He then completed an Associate degree in Administration from the Metropolitan School of Commerce. Rivera served in the United States Army. From 1952 to 1954, he served during the Korean War. He was stationed in Germany until being honorably discharged. Rivera worked for 15 years for Merrill Lynch, Pierce, Fenner & Smith.

Political career
Rivera began his political career in 1968, when he was elected as member of the Municipal Assembly of Bayamón. In 1972, Rivera was elected to the House of Representatives of Puerto Rico representing District 6.

After one term as Representative, Rivera ran for Mayor at the 1976 general election. He defeated incumbent Manuel Aponte Borrero. His main concerns towards Bayamón were in the tourism and business industries. During his 24-year tenure, many buildings and other types of structures were inaugurated, including the Parque De Las Ciencias, the Parque del Trensito (which had, at the time it opened, Puerto Rico's only running train and a DC-3 plane formerly used by United Airlines), the city hall, which is a building that crosses over an avenue, the Ruben Rodriguez Coliseum, the Canton Mall, a small, pedestrian suspension bridge at Lomas Verdes neighborhood and many others. In addition, a large industrial park with such notable companies as 7UP and Wrangler also opened, in the area known as Lomas Verdes. 7UP has a bottling facility there.

Rivera was a member of the New Progressive Party (PNP). Rivera was the president of the New Progressive Party from 1988 until 1989. In 2000, he announced he would not run for mayor again, and his son, Ramón Luis Rivera Jr. was then elected as mayor. Rivera Jr. has held that position ever since. Rivera Sr. has since retired from public life.

See also
List of Puerto Ricans
Bayamón, Puerto Rico
Politics of Puerto Rico

External links
 Ramón Luis Rivera Biography
  Biography - in Spanish.

1929 births
Living people
People from Aguas Buenas, Puerto Rico
Mayors of Bayamón, Puerto Rico
New Progressive Party (Puerto Rico) politicians
New Progressive Party members of the House of Representatives of Puerto Rico
Presidents of the New Progressive Party (Puerto Rico)
Puerto Rican party leaders
Puerto Rican Roman Catholics
United States Army soldiers